Tuggerah railway station is located on the Main Northern line in New South Wales, Australia. It serves the northern Central Coast suburb of Tuggerah, opening in 1890. A pair of passing loops were added north of the station in 1948. These were removed in December 1995. The station was rebuilt in the 1990s.

Platforms & services
Tuggerah has two side platforms. It is serviced by NSW TrainLink Central Coast & Newcastle Line services travelling from Sydney Central to Newcastle. Peak-hour services travel from Central to Wyong via the North Shore line.

Transport links
Busways operate seven routes via Tuggerah station:
78: Westfield Tuggerah to Lake Haven via Warnervale station
79: Westfield Tuggerah to Lake Haven via Hamlyn Terrace & Woongarrah
80: Westfield Tuggerah to Lake Haven via Old Pacific Highway & Wyong Hospital
81: Westfield Tuggerah to Lake Haven via Wattanobbi, Johns Road & Wyongah
82: Westfield Tuggerah to Lake Haven via Tacoma & Wyongah
93: Westfield Tuggerah to Noraville
94: Westfield Tuggerah to Budgewoi

Coastal Liner operate four routes via Tuggerah station:
10: Westfield Tuggerah to Warnervale station
11: to Westfield Tuggerah to Lake Haven
12: to Westfield Tuggerah to Durren Durren
13: to Westfield Tuggerah to Lemon Tree via Warnervale station

Red Bus Services operate seven routes via Tuggerah station:
15: Wyong to The Entrance
16: Wyong TAFE to The Entrance
19: Wyong to Gosford station via Bateau Bay
24: Wyong Hospital to The Entrance via Berkeley Vale & Glenning Valley (combined 25/26 service)
25: Wyong to The Entrance via Glenning Valley
26: Wyong Hospital to The Entrance via Berkeley Vale
47: Wyong to Bateau Bay

References

External links

Tuggerah station details Transport for New South Wales
Tuggerah Station Public Transport Map Transport for NSW

Transport on the Central Coast (New South Wales)
Easy Access railway stations in New South Wales
Railway stations in Australia opened in 1890
Regional railway stations in New South Wales
Main North railway line, New South Wales